Pratt's roundleaf bat (Hipposideros pratti) is a species of bat in the family Hipposideridae. It is found in China, Malaysia, Myanmar, Thailand, and Vietnam.

Taxonomy and etymology
It was described as a new species in 1891 by British zoologist Oldfield Thomas.
The eponym for the species name "pratti" is Antwerp Edgar Pratt.
Pratt collected the holotype that Thomas used to describe the species.

Description

Pratt's roundleaf bat has dorsal fur that is reddish brown in color. However, its ventral fur is lighter. It has a transverse bilobed shield behind the posterior noseleaf. In young males and females the shield may be small, but in old males it becomes an elaborate, flashy structure.

Range and habitat
Pratt's roundleaf bat resides in caves which are typical diurnal roosts site and may contain hundreds or thousands of bats. It also shares its roosts with other bat species such as the great roundleaf bat, Hipposideros armiger.

References

Hipposideros
Mammals described in 1891
Taxa named by Oldfield Thomas
Bats of Asia
Taxonomy articles created by Polbot